Mill Creek is an  tributary of the Tioga River in Tioga County, Pennsylvania in the United States.

See also
List of rivers of Pennsylvania

References

Rivers of Pennsylvania
Rivers of Tioga County, Pennsylvania
Tributaries of the Chemung River